Robert Stone may refer to:

 Rob Stone (entrepreneur) (born 1968), New York-based executive
 Robert Stone (attorney) (1866–1957), Speaker of the Kansas House of Representatives, 1915
 Robert Stone (novelist) (1937–2015), American author, journalist
 Robert Stone (composer) (1516–1614), English composer
 Robert Stone (director), Oscar-nominated documentary director for Radio Bikini
 Robert Stone (rugby league) (1956–2005), Australian player for St. George Dragons
 Robert Stone (silversmith) (1903–1990), English silversmith
 Robert Stone (architect) (born 1968), American architect based in Southern California
 Robert Stone (scientist) (1922–2016), professor, doctor, past National Institutes of Health director
 Robert Stone (trail guide writer) (born 1951), writer of hiking books  
 Robert Stone (wrestler) (born 1983), American professional wrestler
 Robert L. Stone (1922–2009), chief executive of The Hertz Corporation
 Rob Stone (sportscaster), sports commentator
 Rob Stone (actor) (born 1962), American actor and director
 Rob Stone (rapper) (born 1995), American rapper
 Robert Stone (cricketer) (1749–1820), English amateur cricketer
 Robert Granville Stone (1907–2002), American philatelic scholar 
 Robert King Stone (1822–1872), doctor who served U.S. President Abraham Lincoln during the American Civil War
 Robert Stone (athlete) (born 1965), Australian former sprinter
 Robert Stone (basketball) (born 1987), Australian basketball player
 Robert Stone (British Army officer) (1890–1974)
 Robert Spencer Stone (1895–1966), Canadian American pioneer in radiology, radiation therapy and radiation protection